Deam Lake State Recreation Area is an Indiana State Recreation Area in Clark County, Indiana in the United States. Deam Lake State Recreation area is open for year-round recreation, however the campground closes each year from the Sunday before Thanksgiving to March 1 of the following year. Much of the recreation is centered on Deam Lake. It is named for Charles C. Deam, the first state forester of Indiana.

Deam Lake State Recreation Area is adjacent to Clark State Forest. Deam Lake and the park facilities were constructed during the 1960s, opening in 1965. The park operates under a "multiple use concept." Recreational activities at the park include hiking, fishing, hunting, swimming, boating, camping, picnicking and horseback riding.

Deam Lake is a  man-made lake. It was built in 1965. The lake is used for flood control, as a reservoir and for recreational purposes. It is on Big Run which is a tributary of the Muddy Fork River which is part of the Ohio River system. Deam Lake is open for fishing, swimming and boating. Boats are limited to electric motors. Kayaks, canoes and other human powered boats are permitted. Jet-skis are not allowed in the lake. The beach at Deam Lake is open from 8:00am to sunset, Memorial Day through Labor Day. Lifeguards are not provided. There is a beach house and concessionaire that provides snacks and boat rentals.

Deam Lake State Recreation Area features two separate camping facilities. The "regular campground" has 116 campsites that include picnic tables, electric hookups, a fire ring, and parking pad. Access to a dump station for RVs and shower facilities is available. Additionally, the park has 68 "horse campground" sites. The horse campground is equipped with stalls and provides access to a network of trails within the park and the adjacent Clark State Forest.

The park is home to four hiking trails and serves as a trailhead for the  Knobstone Trail which is the longest hiking trail in Indiana.
Trail 1 is a  "easy trail." It begins near the campground and ends at the old playground. Trail 1 is used for a variety of special hikes during the year, including "A Walk in the Woods" which is designed for families with children and the annual "The Haunted Trail" which takes place near Halloween.
Trail 2 is just . Access to the trail has been limited in the aftermath of a severe wind storm in 2008 and an ice storm in 2009. Much of the trail is covered by fallen Virginia Pines.
It begins at the campground and is covered with gravel. It serves hikers, horseback riders and mountain bikers. The trail passes around the north end of Deam Lake and is connected to Knobstone Trail via several side trails.

Environmental Education opportunities are provided at Deam Lake State Recreation Area. An education center is managed by a full-time naturalist. The naturalist hosts a variety of educational sessions throughout the year. A fishing derby for children is led by the naturalist as is a digital camera scavenger hunt, a tree identification program, a group hike on Trail 4 to Lookout Rock and several other nature activities.

References

Protected areas of Clark County, Indiana
Protected areas established in 1965
Parks in Indiana
1965 establishments in Indiana